Glaucocharis microxantha is a moth in the family Crambidae. It was described by Edward Meyrick in 1897. It is found in Australia.

References

Diptychophorini
Moths described in 1897